The Hecla and Fury Islands are members of the Canadian Arctic Archipelago in the territory of Nunavut. They are located in western Gulf of Boothia, near the Boothia Peninsula, and southeast of Martin Islands.

References 

Islands of the Gulf of Boothia
Uninhabited islands of Kitikmeot Region